The 2015 Chicago Cubs season was the 144th season for the franchise, the 140th in the National League and the 100th at Wrigley Field. The Cubs were managed by Joe Maddon in his first year as Cubs manager and played their home games at Wrigley Field as members of the National League Central Division.

They began the season on April 5, 2015 in a first-ever night-game home-opener against the St. Louis Cardinals at partially renovated Wrigley Field, and finished the regular season on October 4, 2015 on the road against the Milwaukee Brewers.

The Cubs finished the season with the third-best record in baseball (97–65) which was also the third-best in their division, finishing one game behind the Pittsburgh Pirates (98–64) and three games behind the division winner, the rival St. Louis Cardinals (100–62). As a result, they qualified for the second wild card spot for the postseason, their first postseason appearance since 2008, and defeated the Pirates in the National League Wild Card Game to advance to the National League Division Series against the Cardinals. The Cubs defeated St. Louis three games to one to advance to the National League Championship Series against the New York Mets, the Cubs' first appearance in the NLCS since 2003. However, they were swept in four games.

In 2015, Forbes valued the Cubs at $1.8 billion, ranking them 17th out of all sports franchises in the world, and the fifth highest in all MLB. The Cubs attendance for the regular season was 2,959,812, up over 300,000 from the previous year.

Previous season 
The Cubs finished the 2014 season 73–89 to finish in last place in the Central Division. Following the season, the Cubs fired manager Rick Renteria and hired former Tampa Bay Rays manager Joe Maddon.

Offseason

Stadium changes
 
On Monday, September 29, one day after the conclusion of the 2014 season, a $575 million four-year renovation project to Wrigley Field began. The bleachers in left and right field were expanded, the stadium was extended further onto both Waveland and Sheffield Avenues, and seven new outfield signs were installed along with a 5,700-square-foot jumbotron scoreboard in the left field bleachers and a 2,400 square foot video scoreboard in the right field bleachers. The parking lots along Clark Street were excavated for underground players' locker rooms and lounges.

Coaching changes
The Cubs decided not to retain Mike Brumley as the assistant hitting coach. Bill Mueller, the hitting coach, resigned over the decision. On October 9. 2014 John Mallee, formerly the Astros hitting coach, was hired as his replacement. Eric Hinske was the assistant hitting coach and Doug Dascenzo was signed to replace him as first base/outfield coach.
In late October 2014, quality assurance coach Jose Castro resigned to work with Atlanta Braves hitting coach Kevin Seitzer.

On October 31, the Cubs fired first year manager Rick Renteria. On Monday, November 3, The Cubs announced the signing of Joe Maddon to a five-year contract as manager of the team. Former Cub Henry Blanco was hired to be the quality assurance coach on November 22. At the start of the 2015 season, Brandon Hyde went from 2014 season bench coach to first base and Doug Dascenzo was the outfield coach. Dave Martinez was bench coach. On February 24, 2015, Manny Ramirez was hired as a batting consultant, splitting time between Chicago and AAA Iowa.  Also, Kevin Youkilis was given a part-time job as a scouting and player development consultant.

Broadcast changes
In June 2014, the Cubs announced an end to their radio play-by-play history on WGN (720-AM) radio which dated back to 1924. In a new partnership with CBS Radio, the radio broadcast of their games moved to WBBM (780-AM) for the 2015 season.

The Cubs finalized a new television broadcast agreement with long-time over-the-air carrier WGN-TV (Channel 9), in which the station would carry a reduced slate of 45 games per season. The team also signed a new broadcast agreement with ABC-owned station WLS-TV (Channel 7), in which they will show 25 games annually; this deal replaced WCIU-TV as the Cubs' secondary over-the-air television outlet. Both agreements with WLS and WGN run through the end of the 2019 season. Play-by-play announcer Len Kasper and color commentator Jim Deshaies became employees of the Cubs rather than WGN-TV.

As a result of a new programming strategy implemented by Tribune Media for WGN America, the cable superstation ceased televising Cubs games (as well as that of the Chicago White Sox and Bulls) to a national audience as of January 2015. This marked the end of a 36-season run of Cubs games televised on the national version of WGN-TV.

The Cubs created affiliate stations to complement the 2015 television and radio schedule.

Transactions
RHP Donn Roach was claimed off the waiver list from the San Diego Padres.
The Atlanta Braves traded second baseman Tommy La Stella to the Cubs for relief pitcher Arodys Vizcaíno and international signing bonus slots.
RHP Jason Hammel signed with Chicago Cubs for a 2-year, $18 million contract after being previously traded in July 2014 to the Oakland Athletics in exchange for top prospect Addison Russell, among other players.
C Miguel Montero was traded by the Arizona Diamondbacks to the Chicago Cubs in exchange for minor league RHP Jefferson Mejia and RHP Zack Godley. Mejia pitched for the Arizona League Cubs in 2014 and Godley pitched for the Daytona Cubs and the Kane County Cougars in 2014.
LHP Jon Lester signed with the Chicago Cubs for six years for $155 million, with a vested option for a seventh. He was officially introduced on December 15, 2014.
Jonathan Herrera signed as a free agent with the Chicago Cubs in December 2014.
Infielder Logan Watkins and relief pitcher Donn Roach were designated for assignment on December 19 to make space for recently claimed Ryan Lavarnway and Shane Peterson.
On December 23, 2014, The Cubs announced that they had signed catcher David Ross to a two-year, $5 million contract.
Chris Denorfia signed a one-year contract worth a guaranteed $2.6 million with $400k in incentives with the Chicago Cubs on January 9, 2015.
On January 19, 2015, outfielder Dexter Fowler was traded to the Cubs from the Houston Astros for Luis Valbuena and Dan Straily.
Gonzalez Germen was claimed off waivers by the Chicago Cubs on January 23, 2015.
On March 5, Cubs signed RHP Phil Coke.

Regular season

Game log

|- style="text-align:center; background:#fbb"
| 1
| April 5
| Cardinals
| 0–3
| Wainwright (1–0)
| Lester (0–1)
| Rosenthal (1)
| 35,055
| 0–1
|- style="text-align:center; background:#bbb"
| –
| April 7
| Cardinals
| colspan="6" | Postponed (inclement weather) (Makeup date: July 7)
|- style="text-align:center; background:#bfb"
| 2
| April 8
| Cardinals
| 2–0
| Arrieta (1–0)
| Lynn (0–1)
| Rondón (1)
| 26,814
| 1–1
|- style="text-align:center; background:#fbb"
| 3
| April 10
| @ Rockies
| 1–5
| Bergman (1–0)
| Wood (0–1)
| —
| 49,303
| 1–2
|- style="text-align:center; background:#bfb"
| 4
| April 11
| @ Rockies
| 9–5
| Hammel (1–0)
| Kendrick (1–1)
| —
| 43,812
| 2–2
|- style="text-align:center; background:#bfb"
| 5
| April 12
| @ Rockies
| 6–5
| Ramirez (1–0)
| Hawkins (1–1)
| Rondon (2)
| 41,363
| 3–2
|- style="text-align:center; background:#bfb"
| 6
| April 13
| Reds
| 7–6 (10)
| Rondon (1–0)
| Parra (0–1)
| —
| 26,390
| 4–2
|- style="text-align:center; background:#fbb"
| 7
| April 14
| Reds
| 0–3
| DeSclafani (1–0)
| Arrieta (1–1)
| Chapman (3)
| 27.525
| 4–3
|- style="text-align:center; background:#bfb"
| 8
| April 15
| Reds
| 5–0
| Wood (1–1)
| Marquis (0–1)
| —
| 29,205
| 5–3
|- style="text-align:center; background:#fbb"
| 9
| April 17
| Padres
| 4–5
| Shields (2–0)
| Schlitter (0–1)
| Kimbrel (4)
| 32,138
| 5–4
|- style="text-align:center; background:#bfb"
| 10
| April 18
| Padres
| 7–6 (11)
| Rosscup (1–0)
| Kimbrel (0–1)
| —
| 33,958
| 6–4
|- style="text-align:center; background:#fbb"
| 11
| April 19
| Padres
| 2–5
| Cashner (1–2)
| Lester (0–2)
| Benoit (1)
| 29,113
| 6–5
|- style="text-align:center; background:#bfb"
| 12
| April 20
| @ Pirates
| 5–2
| Arrieta (2–1)
| Caminero (0–1)
| —
| 11,777
| 7–5
|- style="text-align:center; background:#bfb"
| 13
| April 21
| @ Pirates
| 9–8
| Jackson (1–0)
| Melancon (0–1)
| Rondon (3)
| 13,680
| 8–5
|- style="text-align:center; background:#fbb"
| 14
| April 22
| @ Pirates
| 3–4
| Worley (2–1) 
| Hammel(1–1) 
| Watson (1) 
| 15,101 
| 8–6
|- style="text-align:center; background:#fbb"
| 15
| April 23
| @ Pirates
| 4–5
| Liz (1–1) 
| Schlitter (0–2)
| Melancon (3) 
| 22,224
| 8–7
|- style="text-align:center; background:#bfb"
| 16
| April 24
| @ Reds
| 7–3 (11)
| Motte (1–0)
| Badenhop (0–1)
| —
| 39,891
| 9–7
|- style="text-align:center; background:#bbb"
| –
| April 25
| @ Reds
| colspan="6" | Postponed (inclement weather) (Makeup date: July 22)
|- style="text-align:center; background:#bfb"
| 17
| April 26
| @ Reds
| 5–2
| Arrieta (3–1)
| DeSclafani (2–1)
| Rondon (4)
| 38,954
| 10–7
|- style="text-align:center; background:#bfb"
| 18
| April 27
| Pirates
| 4–0
| Hammel (2–1)
| Worley (2–2)
| —
| 29,159
| 11–7
|- style="text-align:center; background:#bfb"
| 19
| April 28
| Pirates
| 6–2
| Wood (2–1)
| Locke (2–1)
| —
| 29,915
| 12–7
|- style="text-align:center; background:#fbb"
| 20
| April 29
| Pirates
| 1–8
| Cole (4–0)
| Hendricks (0–1)
| —
| 30,634
| 12–8
|-

|- style="text-align:center; background:#bfb"
| 21
| May 1
| Brewers
| 1–0
| Lester (1–2)
| Peralta (0–4)
| Rondon (5)
| 31,128
| 13–8
|- style="text-align:center; background:#fbb"
| 22
| May 2
| Brewers
| 1–6
| Fiers (1–3)
| Arrieta (3–2)
| —
| 34,878
| 13–9
|- style="text-align:center; background:#fbb"
| 23
| May 3
| Brewers
| 3–5
| Smith (1–0)
| Strop (0–1)
| Rodríguez (4)
| 33,398
| 13–10
|- style="text-align:center; background:#fbb"
| 24
| May 4
| @ Cardinals
| 9–10
| Socalovich (2–0)
| Strop (0–2)
| Maness (2)
| 41,981
| 13–11
|- style="text-align:center; background:#fbb"
| 25
| May 5
| @ Cardinals
| 4–7
| Harris (1–0)
| Jackson (1–1)
| Rosenthal (9)
| 41,613
| 13–12
|- style="text-align:center; background:#bfb"
| 26
| May 6
| @ Cardinals
| 6–5
| Lester (2–2)
| Lynn (1–3)
| Rondon (6)
| 42,207
| 14–12
|- style="text-align:center; background:#fbb"
| 27
| May 7
| @ Cardinals
|  1–5
| Lackey (1–2)
| Arrieta (3–3) 
| Rosenthal (10)
| 44,472
| 14–13
|- style="text-align:center; background:#bfb"
| 28
| May 8
| @ Brewers
| 7–6
| Hammel (3–1)
| Nelson (1–3)
| —
| 38,283
| 15–13
|- style="text-align:center; background:#fbb"
| 29
| May 9
| @ Brewers
| 4–12
| Lohse (2–4)
| Wood (2–2)
| —
| 39,600
| 15–14
|- style="text-align:center; background:#fbb"
| 30
| May 10
| @ Brewers
| 2–3 (10)
| Blazek (3–0)
| Motte (1–1) 
| —
| 41,467
| 15–15
|- style="text-align:center; background:#bfb"
| 31
| May 11
| Mets
| 4–3
| Lester (3–2)
| deGrom (3–4)
| Rondon (7)
| 32,980
| 16–15
|- style="text-align:center; background:#bfb"
| 32
| May 12
| Mets
| 6–1
| Arrieta (4–3)
| Syndergaard (0–1)
| —
| 31,542
| 17–15
|- style="text-align:center; background:#bfb"
| 33
| May 13
| Mets
| 2–1
| Rondon (2–0)
| Torres (1–2)
| —
| 33,709
| 18–15
|- style="text-align:center; background:#bfb"
| 34
| May 14
| Mets
| 6–5
| Strop (1–2)
| Niese (3–3)
| Rondon (8)
| 31,497
| 19–15
|- style="text-align:center; background:#bfb"
| 35
| May 15
| Pirates
| 11–10 (12)
| Jackson (2–1)
| Liz (1–3)
| —
| 33,617
| 20–15
|- style="text-align:center; background:#bfb"
| 36
| May 16
| Pirates
| 4–1
| Lester (4–2)
| Cole (5–2)
| Wood (1)
| 38,883
| 21–15
|- style="text-align:center; background:#fbb"
| 37
| May 17
| Pirates
| 0–3
| Burnett (3–1)
| Arrieta (4–4)
| Melancon (9)
| 36,289
| 21–16
|- style="text-align:center; background:#fbb"
| 38
| May 19
| @ Padres
| 3–4
| Benoit (4–1)
| Russell (0–1)
| Kimbrel (11)
| 25,917
| 21–17
|- style="text-align:center; background:#bfb"
| 39
| May 20
| @ Padres
| 3–2
| Grimm (1–0)
| T. Ross (2–4)
| Rondon (9)
| 25.028
| 22–17
|- style="text-align:center; background:#bfb"
| 40
| May 21
| @ Padres
| 3–0
| Hendricks (1–1)
| Despaigne (2–3)
| —
| 30.021
| 23–17
|- style="text-align:center; background:#fbb"
| 41
| May 22
| @ Diamondbacks
| 4–5 (13)
| Delgado (2–2)
| Rosscup (1–1)
| —
| 34,498
| 23–18
|- style="text-align:center; background:#bfb"
| 42
| May 23
| @ Diamondbacks
| 9–6
| Motte(2–1)
| Burgos (0–2)
| Strop (1)
| 30,502
| 24–18
|- style="text-align:center; background:#fbb"
| 43
| May 24
| @ Diamondbacks
| 3–4
| Hellickson (2–3)
| Hammel (3–2)
| Ziegler (2)
| 39,660
| 24–19
|- style="text-align:center; background:#fbb"
| 44
| May 25
| Nationals
| 1–2
| Roark (1–2)
| Grimm (1–1)
| Storen (15)
| 38,463
| 24–20
|- style="text-align:center; background:#bfb"
| 45
| May 26
| Nationals
| 3–2
| Rondon (3–0)
| Grace (2–1)
| —
| 30,440
| 25–20
|- style="text-align:center; background:#fbb"
| 46
| May 27
| Nationals
| 0–3
| Scherzer (6–3)
| Lester (4–3)
| Storen (16)
| 34,215
| 25–21
|- style="text-align:center; background:#fbb"
| 47
| May 29
| Royals
| 4–8
| Herrera (1–1)
| Strop (1–3)
| —
| 34,273
| 25–22
|- style="text-align:center; background:#bbb"
| –
| May 30
| Royals
| colspan="6" | Postponed (inclement weather) (Makeup date: September 28)
|- style="text-align:center; background:#cfc"
| 48
| May 31
| Royals
| 2–1 (11)
| Rosscup (2–1)
| Madson (0–1)
| —
| 37,766
| 26–22
|-

|- style="text-align:center; background:#bfb"
| 49
| June 1
| @ Marlins
| 5–1
| Hammel (4–2)
| Urena (0–2)
| —
| 20,964
| 27–22
|- style="text-align:center; background:#fbb"
| 50
| June 2
| @ Marlins
| 2–5
| Hand (1–1)
| Hendricks (1–2)
| Ramos (5)
| 23,789
| 27–23
|- style="text-align:center; background:#fbb"
| 51
| June 3
| @ Marlins
| 3–7
| Haren (6–2)
| Lester (4–4)
| —
| 22,962
| 27–24
|- style="text-align:center; background:#bfb"
| 52
| June 4
| @ Nationals
| 2–1
| Arrieta (5–4)
| Gonzalez (4–3)
| Rondón (10)
| 35,465
| 28–24
|- style="text-align:center; background:#fbb"
| 53
| June 5
| @ Nationals
| 5–7
| Roark (2–2)
| Wada (0–1)
| –
| 36,124
| 28–25
|- style="text-align:center; background:#bfb"
| 54
| June 6
| @ Nationals
| 4–2
| Hammel (5–2)
| Ross (0–1)
| Strop (2)
| 38,214
| 29–25
|- style="text-align:center; background:#bfb"
| 55
| June 7
| @ Nationals
| 6–3
| Hendricks (2–2)
| Zimmermann (5–3)
| Motte (1)
| 40,939
| 30–25
|- style="text-align:center; background:#fbb"
| 56
| June 9
| @ Tigers
| 0–6
| Sanchez (4–7)
| Lester (4–5)
| —
| 33,301
| 30–26
|- style="text-align:center; background:#bfb"
| 57
| June 10
| @ Tigers
| 12–3
| Arrieta (6–4)
| Greene (4–6)
| —
| 33,397
| 31–26
|- style="text-align:center; background:#bfb"
| 58
| June 11
| Reds
| 6–3
| Wood (3–2)
| Lorenzen (1–2)
| Rondón (11)
| 35,031
| 32–26
|- style="text-align:center; background:#fbb"
| 59
| June 12
| Reds
| 4–5 (10)
| Hoover (5–0)
| Rondón (3–1)
| Chapman (13)
| 40,016
| 32–27
|- style="text-align:center; background:#bfb"
| 60
| June 13
| Reds
| 4–3
| Motte (3–1)
| Cingrani (0–3)
| —
| 40,693
| 33–27
|- style="text-align:center; background:#bfb"
| 61
| June 14
| Reds
| 2–1 (11)
| Schlitter (1–2)
| Badenhop (0–2)
| —
| 33,201
| 34–27
|- style="text-align:center; background:#bbb"
| –
| June 15
| Indians
| colspan="6" | Postponed (inclement weather) (Makeup date: August 24)
|- style="text-align:center; background:#fbb"
| 62
| June 16
| Indians
| 0–6
| Bauer (6–3)
| Arrieta (6–5)
| —
| 35,914
| 34–28
|- style="text-align:center; background:#bfb"
| 63
| June 17
| @ Indians
| 17–0
| Wada (1–1)
| Marcum (3–2)
| —
| 15,572
| 35–28
|- style="text-align:center; background:#fbb"
| 64
| June 18
| @ Indians
| 3–4
| McAllister (2–2)
| Wood (3–3)
| Shaw (1)
| 15,891
| 35–29
|- style="text-align:center; background:#fbb"
| 65
| June 19
| @ Twins
| 2–7
| Hughes (5–6)
| Hendricks (2–3)
| —
| 36,817
| 35–30
|- style="text-align:center; background:#bfb"
| 66
| June 20
| @ Twins
| 4–1 (10)
| Motte (4–1)
| Boyer (2–3)
| Rondon (12)
| 40,066
| 36–30
|- style="text-align:center; background:#bfb"
| 67
| June 21
| @ Twins
| 8–0
| Arrieta (7–5)
| Gibson (4–6)
| —
| 40,273
| 37–30
|- style="text-align:center; background:#bfb"
| 68
| June 22
| Dodgers
| 4–2
| Wood (4–3)
| Kershaw (5–5)
| Motte (2)
| 35,147
| 38–30
|- style="text-align:center; background:#bfb"
| 69
| June 23
| Dodgers
| 1–0 (10)
| Motte (5–1)
| Peralta (1–1)
| —
| 36,799
| 39–30
|- style="text-align:center; background:#fbb"
| 70
| June 24
| Dodgers
| 2–5
| Howell (3–1)
| Hendricks (2–4)
| Jansen (10)
| 36.653
| 39–31
|- style="text-align:center; background:#fbb"
| 71
| June 25
| Dodgers
| 0–4
| Frias (5–5)
| Lester (4–6)
| —
| 41,498
| 39–32
|- style="text-align:center; background:#fbb"
| 72
| June 26
| @ Cardinals
| 2–3
| Maness (2–0)
| Grimm (1–2)
| —
| 45,558
| 39–33
|- style="text-align:center; background:#fbb"
| 73
| June 27
| @ Cardinals
| 1–8
| Wacha (10–3)
| Roach (0–1)
| Villanueva (1)
| 46,407
| 39–34
|- style="text-align:center; background:#fbb"
| 74
| June 28
| @ Cardinals
| 1–4
| Martinez (9–3)
| Hammel (5–3)
| Rosenthal (23)
| 45,384
| 39–35
|- style="text-align:center; background:#bfb"
| 75
| June 30
| @ Mets
| 1–0
| Hendricks (3–4)
| Niese (3–8)
| Motte (3)
| 27,084
| 40–35
|-

|- style="text-align:center; background:#bfb"
| 76
| July 1
| @ Mets
| 2–0 (11)
| Motte (6–1)
| Torres (2–4)
| Grimm (1)
| 23,906
| 41–35
|- style="text-align:center; background:#bfb"
| 77
| July 2
| @ Mets
| 6–1
| Arrieta (8–5)
| deGrom (8–6)
| —
| 27,207
| 42–35
|- style="text-align:center; background:#fbb"
| 78
| July 3
| Marlins
| 1–2
| Koehler (7–4)
| Hammel (5–4)
| Ramos (13)
| 41,212
| 42–36
|- style="text-align:center; background:#bfb"
| 79
| July 4
| Marlins
| 7–2
| Richard (1–0)
| Cosart (1–4)
| —
| 37,898
| 43–36
|- style="text-align:center; background:#bfb"
| 80
| July 5
| Marlins
| 2–0
| Hendricks (4–4)
| Latos (3–6)
| Motte (4)
| 37,766
| 44–36
|- style="text-align:center; background:#fbb"
| 81
| July 6
| Cardinals
| 0–6
| Lackey (7–5)
| Lester(4–7)
| —
| 37,609
| 44–37
|- style="text-align:center; background:#bfb"
| 82
| July 7
| Cardinals
| 7–4
| Arrieta (9–5)
| Lyons (2–1)
| —
| 34,368
| 45–37
|- style="text-align:center; background:#bfb"
| 83
| July 7
| Cardinals
| 5–3
| Wood (5–3)
| Maness (3–1)
| Motte (5)
| 35,703
| 46–37
|- style="text-align:center; background:#fbb"
| 84
| July 8
| Cardinals
| 5–6
| Socolovich (3–1)
| Strop (1–4)
| Rosenthal (25)
| 37,993
| 46–38
|- style="text-align:center; background:#fbb"
| 85
| July 10
| White Sox
| 0–1
| Petricka (3–2)
| Rondon (3–2)
| Robertson (19)
| 41,580
| 46–39
|- style="text-align:center; background:#fbb"
| 86
| July 11
| White Sox
| 1–5
| Sale (8–4)
| Lester (4–8)
| —
| 41,596
| 46–40
|- style="text-align:center; background:#bfb"
| 87
| July 12
| White Sox
| 3–1
| Arrieta (10–5)
| Quintana (4–9)
| —
| 41,688
| 47–40
|- style="text-align:center; background:#bbcaff;"
| colspan="9" | 86th All-Star Game in Cincinnati, Ohio 
|- style="text-align:center; background:#fbb"
| 88
| July 17
| @ Braves
| 2–4
| Vizciano (1–0)
| Strop (1–5)
| Johnson (6)
| 42,532
| 47–41
|- style="text-align:center; background:#bfb"
| 89
| July 18
| @ Braves
| 4–0
| Lester (5–8)
| Banuelos (1–1)
| —
| 45,758
| 48–41
|- style="text-align:center; background:#bfb"
| 90
| July 19
| @ Braves
| 4–1
| Arrieta (11–5)
| Miller (5–6)
| —
| 31,690
| 49–41
|- style="text-align:center; background:#fbb"
| 91
| July 20
| @ Reds
| 4–5
| Matthews (1–1)
| Grimm (1–3)
| Chapman (19)
| 34,900
| 49–42
|- style="text-align:center; background:#bfb"
| 92
| July 21
| @ Reds
| 5–4 (13)
| Motte (7–1)
| Adcock (1–2)
| Grimm (2)
| 36,845
| 50–42
|- style="text-align:center; background:#fbb"
| 93
| July 22
| @ Reds
| 1–9
| Leake (8–5)
| Hendricks (4–5)
| —
| 35,093
| 50–43
|- style="text-align:center; background:#bfb"
| 94
| July 22
| @ Reds
| 6–5
| Rondon (4–2)
| Chapman (3–4)
| Motte (6)
| 39,183
| 51–43
|- style="text-align:center; background:#fbb"
| 95
| July 24
| Phillies
| 3–5 (10)
| Giles (5–2)
| Russell (0–2)
| Papelbon (17)
| 41,230
| 51–44
|- style="text-align:center; background:#fbb"
| 96
| July 25
| Phillies
| 0–5
| Hamels (6–7)
| Arrieta (11–6)
| —
| 41,683
| 51–45
|- style="text-align:center; background:#fbb"
| 97
| July 26
| Phillies
| 5–11
| Nola (1–1)
| Hammel (5–5)
| —
| 41,123
| 51–46
|- style="text-align:center; background:#bfb"
| 98
| July 27
| Rockies
| 9–8
| Soriano (1–0)
| Axford (3–4)
| —
| 35,070
| 52–46
|- style="text-align:center; background:#fbb"
| 99
| July 28
| Rockies
| 2–7
| Flande (1–1)
| Beeler (0–1)
| —
| 36.747
| 52–47
|- style="text-align:center; background:#bfb"
| 100
| July 29
| Rockies
| 3–2
| Lester (6–8)
| Butler (3–7)
| Rondon (13)
| 38,874
| 53–47
|- style="text-align:center; background:#bfb"
| 101
| July 30
| @ Brewers
|  5–2
| Soriano (2–0)
| Smith (4–2)
| Rondon (14)
| 36,206
| 54–47
|- style="text-align:center; background:#bfb"
| 102
| July 31
| @ Brewers
| 4–1
| Hammel (6–5)
| Jungmann (5–3)
| Rondon (15)
| 35,669
| 55–47
|-

|- style="text-align:center; background:#bfb"
| 103
| August 1
| @ Brewers
| 4–2
| Hendricks (5–5)
| Garza (5–12)
| Hunter (1)
| 41,720
| 56–47
|- style="text-align:center; background:#bfb"
| 104
| August 2
| @ Brewers
| 4–3
| Richard (2–0)
| Lohse (5–13)
| Rondon (16)
| 38,536
| 57–47
|- style="text-align:center; background:#bbb"
| —
| August 3
| @ Pirates
| colspan="6" | Postponed (inclement weather) (Makeup date: September 15)
|- style="text-align:center; background:#bfb"
| 105
| August 4
| @ Pirates
| 5–0
| Arrieta (12–6)
| Happ (4–7)
| —
| 34,993
| 58–47
|- style="text-align:center; background:#fbb"
| 106
| August 5
| @ Pirates
| 5–7
| Bastardo (3–1)
| Wood (5–4)
| Melancon (34)
| 35,759
| 58–48
|- style="text-align:center; background:#bfb"
| 107
| August 6
| Giants
| 5–4
| Grimm (2–3)
| Heston (11–6)
| Rondon (17)
| 41,242
| 59–48
|- style="text-align:center; background:#bfb"
| 108
| August 7
| Giants
| 7–3
| Lester (7–8)
| Vogelsong (7–8)
| Rondon (18)
| 41,311
| 60–48
|- style="text-align:center; background:#bfb"
| 109
| August 8
| Giants
| 8–6
| Hendricks (6–5)
| Cain (2–3)
|Grimm (3)
| 41,305
| 61–48
|- style="text-align:center; background:#bfb"
| 110
| August 9
| Giants
| 2–0
| Arrieta (13–6)
| Peavy (2–5)
| Rondon (19)
| 39,939
| 62–48
|- style="text-align:center; background:#bfb"
| 111
| August 11
| Brewers
| 6–3
| Haren (8–7)
| Jungmann (6–4)
| Russell (1)
| 37,109
| 63–48
|- style="text-align:center; background:#bfb"
| 112
| August 12
| Brewers
| 3–2 (10)
| Hunter (3–2)
| Blazek (5–3)
| —
| 36,438 
| 64–48
|- style="text-align:center; background:#bfb"
| 113
| August 13
| Brewers
| 9–2
| Lester (8–8)
| Cravy (0–4)
| —
| 40,799
| 65–48
|- style="text-align:center; background:#bfb"
| 114
| August 14
| @ White Sox
| 6–5
| Richard (3–0)
| Samardzija (8–8)
|Rondon (20)
| 36,386
| 66–48
|- style="text-align:center; background:#bfb"
| 115
| August 15
| @ White Sox
| 6–3
| Arrieta (14–6)
| Quintana (6–10)
| Rondon (21) 
| 39,579
| 67–48
|- style="text-align:center; background:#fbb"
| 116
| August 16
| @ White Sox
| 1–3
| Sale (11–7)
| Haren (8–8)
| Robertson (24)
| 39,475
| 67–49
|- style="text-align:center; background:#fbb"
| 117
| August 18
| Tigers
| 8–10
| Alburquerque (3–0)
| Strop (1–6)
| —
| 39,684
| 67–50
|- style="text-align:center; background:#fbb"
| 118
| August 19
| Tigers
| 8–15
| Feliz (3–3)
| Lester (8–9)
| —
| 40,310
| 67–51
|- style="text-align:center; background:#bfb"
| 119
| August 20
| Braves
| 7–1
| Arrieta (15–6)
| Foltynewicz (4–5)
| —
| 34,633
| 68–51
|- style="text-align:center; background:#bfb"
| 120
| August 21
| Braves
| 5–3
| Motte (8–1)
| Miller (5–10)
| Rondon (22)
| 39,211
| 69–51
|- style="text-align:center; background:#bfb"
| 121
| August 22
| Braves
| 9–7
| Strop (2–6)
| Jackson (2–2)
| Rondon (23)
| 41,196
| 70–51
|- style="text-align:center; background:#bfb"
| 122
| August 23
| Braves
| 9–3
| Hammel (7–5)
| Wisler (5–4)
| —
| 39,581
| 71–51
|- style="text-align:center; background:#bfb"
| 123
|August 24
|Indians
| 2–1
| Rondon (5–2)
| McAllister (3–4)
| —
| 36,283
| 72–51
|- style="text-align:center; background:#bfb"
|124
| August 25
| @ Giants
| 8–5
| Arrieta (16–6)
| Cain (2–4)
| Rondon (24)
| 41,595
| 73–51
|- style="text-align:center; background:#fbb"
| 125
| August 26
| @ Giants
| 2–4
| Peavy (4–2)
| Hendricks (6–6)
| Casilla (31)
| 41,640
| 73–52
|- style="text-align:center; background:#fbb"
| 126
| August 27
| @ Giants
| 1–9
| Bumgarner (16−6)
| Haren (8–9)
| —
| 41,847
| 73–53
|- style="text-align:center; background:#fbb"
| 127
| August 28
| @ Dodgers
| 1–4
| Kershaw (11−6)
| Hammel (7−6)
| Jansen (26)
| 44,874
| 73–54
|- style="text-align:center; background:#fbb"
| 128
| August 29
| @ Dodgers
| 2–5
| Howell (5−1)
| Lester (8−10)
| Jansen (27)
| 51,697
| 73–55
|- style="text-align:center; background:#bfb"
| 129
| August 30
| @ Dodgers
| 2–0
| Arrieta (17–6)
| Wood (9–9)
| —
| 46,679
| 74–55
|- style="text-align:center; background:#fbb"
| 130
| August 31
| Reds
| 5–13
| Mattheus (2−4)
| Grimm (2−4)
| Chapman (26)
| 34,017
| 74–56
|-

|- style="text-align:center; background:#bfb"
| 131
| September 1
| Reds
| 5–4
| Rodney (6−5)
| Badenhop (1−4)
| Rondon (25)
| 33,756
| 75–56
|- style="text-align:center; background:#fbb"
| 132
| September 2
| Reds
| 4–7
| Hoover (7−0)
| Rondon (5−3)
| Chapman (27)
| 31,165
| 75–57
|- style="text-align:center; background:#bfb"
| 133
| September 4
| Diamondbacks
| 14–5
| Lester (9−10)
| Godley (4−1)
| —
| 36,132
| 76–57
|- style="text-align:center; background:#bfb"
| 134
| September 5
| Diamondbacks
| 2–0
| Arrieta (18–6)
| Ray (3–11)
| Rondon (26)
| 40,690
| 77–57
|- style="text-align:center; background:#bfb"
| 135
| September 6
| Diamondbacks
| 6–4
| Grimm (3−4)
| De La Rosa (12−7)
| —
| 41,183
| 78–57
|- style="text-align:center; background:#bfb"
| 136
| September 7
| @ Cardinals
| 9–0
| Haren (9–9)
| Lynn (11–9)
| —
| 45,986
| 79–57
|- style="text-align:center; background:#bfb"
| 137
| September 8
| @ Cardinals
| 8–5
| Hammel (8–6)
| Wacha (15–5)
| Rondón (27)
| 42,206
| 80–57
|- style="text-align:center; background:#fbb"
| 138
| September 9
| @ Cardinals
|3–4
| Broxton (2−1)
| Richard (3−1)
| Rosenthal (43)
| 43,557
| 80–58
|- style="text-align:center; background:#bfb"
| 139
| September 11
| @ Phillies
| 5–1
| Arrieta (19–6)
| Morgan (5–6)
| —
| 
| 81–58
|- style="text-align:center; background:#bfb"
| 140
| September 11
| @ Phillies
| 7–3
| Hendricks (7–6)
| Asher (0–3)
| Rondón (28)
| 22,538
| 82–58
|- style="text-align:center; background:#fbb"
| 141
| September 12
| @ Phillies
| 5–7
| Giles (6–2)
| Rondón (5–4)
| —
| 20,813
| 82–59
|- style="text-align:center; background:#fbb"
| 142
| September 13
| @ Phillies
| 4–7
| Hinojosa (1–0)
| Richard (3–2)
| Giles (13)
| 23,450
| 82–60
|- style="text-align:center; background:#fbb"
| 143
| September 15
| @ Pirates
| 4–5
| Watson (4–1)
| Grimm (3–5)
| Melancon (46)
| 31,488
| 82–61
|- style="text-align:center; background:#bfb"
| 144
| September 15
| @ Pirates
| 2–1
| Lester (10–10)
| Happ (9–8)
| —
| 25,914
| 83–61
|- style="text-align:center; background:#bfb"
| 145
| September 16
| @ Pirates
| 3–2 (12)
| Rondón (6–4)
| Worley (4–6)
| —
| 31,945
| 84–61
|- style="text-align:center; background:#bfb"
| 146
| September 17
| @ Pirates
| 9–6
| Richard (4–2)
| Morton (9–8)
| Wood (2)
| 28,228
| 85–61
|- style="text-align:center; background:#bfb"
| 147
| September 18
| Cardinals
| 8–3
| Hunter (4−2)
| Maness (4−2)
| —
| 40,846
| 86–61
|- style="text-align:center; background:#bfb"
| 148
| September 19
| Cardinals
| 5–4
| Cahill (1–3)
| Wacha (16–6)
| Strop (3)
| 40,994
| 87–61
|- style="text-align:center; background:#fbb"
| 149
| September 20
| Cardinals
| 3–4
| Martinez (14–7)
| Lester (10–11)
| Rosenthal (46)
| 40,962
| 87–62
|- style="text-align:center; background:#bfb"
| 150
| September 21
| Brewers
| 9–5
| Hammel (9–6)
| Peralta (5–10)
| —
| 34,373
| 88–62
|- style="text-align:center; background:#bfb"
| 151
| September 22
| Brewers
| 4–0
| Arrieta (20–6)
| Cravy (0–8)
| —
| 36,270
| 89–62
|- style="text-align:center; background:#fbb"
| 152
| September 23
| Brewers
| 1–4
| Davies (2–2)
| Hendricks (7–7)
| Rodrigues (35)
| 37,559
| 89–63
|- style="text-align:center; background:#fbb"
| 153
| September 25
| Pirates
| 2–3
|Cole (18–8)
|Lester (10−12)
| Melancon (51)
|40,432
| 89–64
|- style="text-align:center; background:#fbb"
| 154
| September 26
| Pirates
| 0–4
| Liriano (12−7)
| Hammel (9−7)
| —
| 41,150
| 89–65
|- style="text-align:center; background:#bfb"
| 155
| September 27
| Pirates
| 4–0
| Arrieta (21−6)
| Burnett (9-6)
| —
| 40,617
| 90–65
|- style="text-align:center; background:#bfb"
| 156
| September 28
| Royals
| 1–0 (11)
|Rodney (7−5)
|Almonte (0−2)
| –
| 40,552
| 91–65
|- style="text-align:center; background:#bfb"
| 157
| September 29
| @ Reds
| 4–1
| Haren (10–9)
| Smith (0–3)
| Wood (3)
| 18,168
| 92–65
|- style="text-align:center; background:#bfb"
| 158
| September 30
| @ Reds
| 10–3
| Lester (11–12)
| DeScalfani (9–13)
| —
| 21,397
|93–65
|-

|- style="text-align:center; background:#bfb"
| 159
| October 1
| @ Reds
| 5–3
| Hammel (10–7)
| Lamb (1–5)
| Rondon (29)
| 26,352
| 94–65
|- style="text-align:center; background:#bfb"
| 160
| October 2
| @ Brewers
| 6–1
| Arrieta (22–6)
| Pena (2–1)
| —
| 30,044
| 95–65
|- style="text-align:center; background:#bfb"
| 161
| October 3
| @ Brewers
| 1–0
| Hendricks (8–7)
| Wagner (0–2)
|  Rondon (30)
| 35,291
| 96–65
|- style="text-align:center; background:#bfb"
| 162
| October 4
| @ Brewers
| 3–1
| Haren (11–9)
| Lopez (1–1)
| Wood (4)
| 32,959
| 97–65
|-

|- style="text-align:center;"
| Legend:       = Win       = Loss       = PostponementBold = Cubs team member

Season standings

Record vs. opponents

Opening Day starters

Season summary

April
At the conclusion of the first month of the season the Cubs had a record of 12–8. It was their first winning April since the 2008 season. They led the National League in stolen bases with 25, were third in on-base percentage with .329, and sixth in acquiring walks with 71. The pitching staff allowed the fewest walks in the National League with 41, they were third in WHIP with 1.15, fifth in striking out opposing batters with 181, sixth in opposing players batting average with .240, sixth in earned run average with 3.71 and allowed only 14 home runs against them. During the month, the Cubs played in three extra-inning ballgames, winning all three.
April 5 – The Cubs pay tribute to the late Ernie Banks before the first opening night game in Cubs history.
April 17 – Heralded rookie Kris Bryant plays in his first Major League game.
April 5–30 – Due to delays in the 1060 Project, the entire outfield section was unavailable for use by fans attending Cubs games. Attendance figures for the month of April were affected by approximately 5,000 fans per home game.

May
At the end of the first two months of the season the Cubs had a record of 26–22. It was the first winning two-month period since the end of the 2008 season. They were third in the National League in stolen bases with 46 and second at receiving walks at 192. They did, however, lead the league in striking out at 541. The pitching staff allowed the second fewest walks in the National League with 140, they were third in WHIP, third in striking out opposing batters, sixth in opposing players batting average with .246,  fifth in earned run average with 3.72, and allowed 56 home runs against them. 
May 11 – Left and center field bleacher seats were available for occupancy for the first time during the season during a night game with the New York Mets.
May 14 – The Cubs four-game sweep of the NY Mets was their first over the Mets at Wrigley Field since Aug. 6–9, 1992. The May 14 victory was Joe Maddon's 800th career win.
May 31 – For the first time in nearly a half-decade the Cubs finished at or above .500 for two months in a row with a May 31 victory against the Kansas City Royals.
Kris Bryant received the Major League Baseball Rookie of the Month Award for May.

June
June 11 – The right field bleacher seats were available for occupancy for the first time during the season during a night game with the Cincinnati Reds. Dexter Fowler hit the first home run to land into the newly renovated right-field seats at Wrigley Field when fans were present.
June 17 – The Cubs 17–0 victory at Progressive Field against the Cleveland Indians was the largest shutout win by the Cubs since May 13, 1969, a 19–0 win over the Padres at Wrigley Field.
June 30 – The Cubs finished 14–13 for the month; the third month in a row with a winning record.

July
July 6 – Anthony Rizzo (1B) and Kris Bryant (3B) were named to the National League All-Star Team.
July 13 – At the All-Star break the Cubs had a record of 47–40. They were seventh in Major League baseball in stolen bases with 57 and fourth at receiving walks at 293. They were second in the league in striking out at 799. The pitching staff allowed the fewest hits against in baseball with 140, they were first in WHIP at 1.16, third in striking out opposing batters with 754, first in opposing players batting average with .234, fifth in earned run average with 3.72, and allowed 56 home runs.
July 25 –  Future Cubs pitcher Cole Hamels then of the Philadelphia Phillies pitched a no-hitter against the Cubs, marking the first time the Cubs have been no-hit in 7,921 games, which was the longest streak in the Major Leagues. It was Hamels last start in a Phillies uniform before he was traded to the Texas Rangers.
The Cubs finished a fourth month in a row over .500 for the first time since the 2008 season. With a record of 55–47, they were two games out of the second position to qualify for a wild card post-season playoff game.

August

August 10 – After a four-game sweep of the San Francisco Giants, the Cubs had moved into the wild card spot and held a 3.5 game lead for the second place wild card qualifier.
August 23 – The Cubs swept the Atlanta Braves, their fourth, four-game sweep of the season; first time since 1945. The Cubs led the NL in both home runs and runs scored in the second half.
August 30 – Jake Arrieta threw a no hitter against the Los Angeles Dodgers.
 For the fifth month in a row, the Cubs finished a month over .500 with an August record of 19−9. They were 5.5 games ahead of San Francisco for the second wild card slot. They led the majors in striking out with 1,208 and had the lowest team batting average at .241. The pitching staff struck out 1,128 batters (second in the majors) and had a WHIP of 1.20. Kris Bryant was named the NL Rookie of the Month for August and Jake Arrieta was named the Pitcher of the Month and Player of the Week for August 24–30.

September
September 1 – IF Javier Baez and LHP Tsuyoshi Wada were recalled from Triple-A Iowa. Catcher David Ross was activated off the family medical emergency leave list. Later in the month, the Cubs also selected the contracts of OF Quintin Berry, RHP Trevor Cahill, RHP Carl Edwards Jr., RHP Zac Rosscup and RHP Yoervis Medina from Triple-A.
September 11 – The Cubs swept a double header against the Phillies guaranteeing them a winning record for the first time since 2009. Jake Arrieta won his 19th game of the season making him the first pitcher in the 2015 season to hit the mark; it was his 16th straight quality start, allowing just one run over eight innings, and dropping his ERA to 1.99.
September 25 – The Cubs were defeated by their division rival Pittsburgh, 3-2, but still clinched their first postseason berth since 2008 when the San Francisco Giants lost to the Oakland A's.

October
October 4 – At the conclusion of the season the Cubs had a record of 97–65, third best in Major League Baseball. The 97 wins were the most for a first-year Cubs manager. Their record away from Wrigley Field was 48−33, the Cubs' best road record since 1945. Cubs' hitters led the majors in strikeouts with 1,518 and were third from the bottom with runners in scoring position (.237), but they were fifth in on-base percentage with .321 and first in acquiring walks with 567. The pitching staff allowed the fewest hits in baseball with 1,276, were first in WHIP with 1.15, first in striking out opposing batters with 1,431, and third in earned run average with 3.36. Cubs rookies (Bryant, Schwarber, Russell and Soler) hit 65 home runs, setting a franchise record. The previous high was 58 set in 1966.

November
November 16 – Kris Bryant won the 2015 National League Major League Baseball Rookie of the Year Award by a unanimous first place vote. San Francisco Giants third baseman Matt Duffy and Pittsburgh Pirates infielder Jung-ho Kang placed behind Bryant. Bryant became the first Cub to win the award since catcher Geovany Soto in 2008.
November 17 – Manager Joe Maddon won the Manager of the Year Award over St. Louis Cardinals manager Mike Matheny and NL-Champions New York Mets manager Terry Collins. Maddon set the franchise record for most wins in the first season as manager, with 97 wins. Maddon became the seventh manager in MLB history to win the award in both leagues, as Maddon previously won the award in 2008 and 2011 with Tampa Bay. He became the first Cubs manager to win the award since Lou Piniella in 2008. 
November 18 – Starting pitcher Jake Arrieta won the 2015 NL Cy Young Award over Dodgers pitchers Zack Greinke and Clayton Kershaw. Arrieta had a stellar 2015 campaign, going 22–6 with a 1.77 ERA. Arrieta set a major league record with the lowest second-half ERA over a minimum of 12 starts with an ERA of 0.75. He went 14–1 in the second half of the season, as well as no-hitting the Dodgers on August 30. Arrieta is the first Cub to win the award since Hall of Famer Greg Maddux in 1992. The Cubs also became the first team in MLB to win three major awards since the 2001 Seattle Mariners.

Transactions 
Back-up catcher Welington Castillo was traded to the Seattle Mariners for right-handed relief pitcher Yoervis Medina on May 19. 
On May 26, released Phil Coke.  
13-year-veteran right-handed relief pitcher Rafael Soriano agreed to terms on June 8 and reported to a Cubs training facility in the Dominican Republic.
On July 3, 2015, Clayton Richard was traded by the Pittsburgh Pirates to the Chicago Cubs for cash. He was designated for assignment on July 22 and relief pitcher Yoervis Medina was added to the roster. Richard was optioned to the Iowa Cubs on July 23 and was again designated for assignment on August 3 but was re-signed as a free agent on August 5.
On July 19, 2015 RHP Edwin Jackson was designated for assignment to make room on the major league roster for reliever Rafael Soriano. On August 14, Jackson signed a contract with the Atlanta Braves for the remainder of the 2015 season.
On July 31, the Cubs acquired Tommy Hunter from the Baltimore Orioles for Junior Lake and acquired Dan Haren from the Miami Marlins for minor leaguers Elliot Soto and Ivan Pineyro.
On August 27, RHP Fernando Rodney was traded by the Seattle Mariners to the Cubs for a player to be named later or cash. 
On August 31, CF Austin Jackson was traded by the Seattle Mariners to the Cubs for a player to be named later. 
The Cubs released Rafael Soriano on September 4.

Roster

Postseason

Game log

|- style = "background: #bfb"
| 1 || Oct 7 ||  @ Pirates || 4–0 || Arrieta (1–0) || Cole (0–1)  || — || 40,889 || 1–0
|-

|-  style = "background: #fbb"
| 1 || Oct 9 || @ Cardinals ||0–4 ||Lackey (1–0)||Lester (0–1)|| — ||47,830||0–1
|- style = "background: #bfb"
| 2 || Oct 10 || @ Cardinals || 6–3 || Wood (1–0) || García (0–1) || Rondón (1) || 47,859 || 1–1
|- style = "background: #bfb"
| 3 || Oct 12 || Cardinals || 8–6 || Arrieta (2–0)  || Wacha (0-1)  || — || 42,411 || 2–1
|- style = "background: #bfb"
| 4 || Oct 13 || Cardinals || 6–4 || Cahill (1–0) || Siegrist (0–1) || Rondón (2) || 42,411 || 3–1
|-

|-  style = "background: #fbb"
| 1 || Oct 17 || @ Mets || 2–4 || Harvey (1–0) || Lester (0–1) || Familia (1) || 44,287 || 0–1
|- style =  "background: #fbb"
| 2 || Oct 18 || @ Mets || 1–4 || Syndergaard (1–1) || Arrieta (2–1) || Familia (2) || 44,502 || 0–2
|- style =  "background: #fbb"
| 3 || Oct 20 || Mets || 2–5 || deGrom (3-0) || Cahill (0-1) || Familia (3) ||42,231 || 0–3
|- style =  "background:   #fbb"
| 4 || Oct 21 || Mets || 3–8 || Colón (1–0) ||Hammel (0–1)  || — ||42,227  ||  0–4
|-

|- style="text-align:center;"
| Legend:       = Win       = Loss       = PostponementBold = Cubs team member

Wild Card Game 

Jake Arrieta pitched a complete game shutout, striking out 11 batters and allowing only five hits to defeat the Pittsburgh Pirates 4–0 in the 2015 National League Wild Card Game. The Cubs were paced offensively by Dexter Fowler and Kyle Schwarber, who combined for five hits in seven at bats, each with a home run. For the first time in 12 years, the Cubs won a postseason game after losing their previous nine postseason games in a row and advanced to play the St. Louis Cardinals in the National League Division Series.

Division Series

Game 1

John Lackey allowed only three singles in seven innings and the Cardinals beat the Cubs 4–0 in the NLDS opening game. Rookies Tommy Pham and Stephen Piscotty each homered for the Cardinals. Cubs starter, Jon Lester, gave up three runs in 7 1/3 innings and left the game trailing 2–0.

Game 2

In their first divisional game win since 2003, the Cubs got five second inning runs including a two-run home run from Jorge Soler en route to a 6–3 win. Cubs starter Kyle Hendricks pitched well, but allowed a home run to the leadoff batter, third baseman Matt Carpenter in the first, and back-to-back solo shots to Kolten Wong and Randal Grichuk in the fifth inning which led to his exit. Travis Wood, Trevor Cahill and Héctor Rondón worked 4 1/3 innings of relief.

Game 3

The Cubs got 13 hits to support Jake Arrieta who struck out nine Cardinals over 5-2/3 innings while giving up four runs, the most he had allowed since June 16. Four rookies started for the Cubs and three of them helped to set a Major League playoff team record with six home runs in an 8–6 victory. Six different Cubs players homered – Kyle Schwarber in the second inning, Starlin Castro in the fourth, Kris Bryant and Anthony Rizzo back-to-back in the fifth, Jorge Soler in the sixth, and Dexter Fowler in the eighth inning. Jason Heyward hit a sixth inning homer off Arrieta and Stephen Piscotty hit a two-run ninth inning homer off Héctor Rondón for the Cardinals. The eight total home runs for both teams set a Major League mark for one postseason game. Shortstop Addison Russell left the game in the fourth with left hamstring tightness after sliding head first into third on a triple. Russell would not play the remainder of the postseason.

Game 4

Eight Chicago Cub pitchers allowed eight hits and combined for 15 strikeouts to defeat the St. Louis Cardinals and win a postseason series for the first time ever at Wrigley Field. The score was 2–0 in favor of the Cardinals when the second batter of the game, Stephen Piscotty, hit a two-run homer. In the bottom of the second inning, starting pitcher Jason Hammel drove in Starlin Castro with a sharp single to center and Addison Russell's replacement at shortstop, Javier Báez, followed with a three-run homer to right off Cardinals starter, John Lackey. The Cards rallied and tied the score in the top of the sixth, but the rally ended with a strong throw to catcher Miguel Montero from right fielder Jorge Soler to throw out Tony Cruz at the plate as Cruz attempted to score the lead run from second. Anthony Rizzo hit a go-ahead solo homer off Cardinal reliever Kevin Siegrist in the bottom of the inning on a two out, 0-2 pitch. Kyle Schwarber added an insurance run in the seventh inning, also off Siegrist, with a home run ball that landed on top of the new right field Budweiser scoreboard. Pedro Strop in the eighth and Héctor Rondón in the ninth struck out four of the seven batters they faced to preserve the 6–4 victory.

Championship Series

Game 1

Game 2

Game 3

For the third game in the series, the Mets scored in the first with a double by Yoenis Céspedes that drove in David Wright off of Cubs starter, Kyle Hendricks. A home run by Kyle Schwarber tied the game in the bottom of the first. In the third, the Mets responded with Daniel Murphy's solo homer, his fifth consecutive postseason game with a home run, to put the Mets up 2–1. Jorge Soler's homer in the fourth again tied the game. The bottom fell out for the Cubs in the sixth when a wild pitch by Trevor Cahill (the losing pitcher) on strike three allowed Yoenis Céspedes to score, putting the Mets up 3–2. A Céspedes single and a sacrifice grounder by Lucas Duda in the seventh drove in Wright and Murphy, for a final score of 5–2 and series deficit of 3–0 for the Cubs.

Game 4

As in every previous game of the series, the Mets took control of the game in the first inning when first baseman Lucas Duda hit a three-run home run to center field against Cubs starter Jason Hammel. The next batter, catcher Travis d'Arnaud, also hit a home run to make it 4–0. In the second inning, Cubs relief pitcher Travis Wood allowed a two-run double to Duda making it a 6–0 game. Duda's five RBIs tied a Mets record for most in a postseason game. Chicago's first rally came in the fourth when they loaded the bases with no outs for second baseman Starlin Castro. Mets third baseman David Wright made a leaping grab of Castro's line drive to prevent an extra base hit and two runs. However, the Cubs got their first run on an RBI groundout by left fielder Kyle Schwarber. Shortstop Javier Báez popped out in foul territory, stranding two runners and the Cubs were down 6–1. In the fifth inning, after outfielders Dexter Fowler and Jorge Soler reached base, Mets reliever Bartolo Colón struck out third baseman Kris Bryant and the Cubs again stranded two baserunners. In the eighth inning, New York's Daniel Murphy hit a two-run homer, his fourth home run of the series, his seventh of the postseason, and his sixth consecutive game with a home run, a new MLB postseason record. Bryant hit a consolation two-run home run in the bottom of the eighth to put the Mets lead to 8–3. When closer Jeurys Familia struck out Fowler in the ninth, the Mets were back in the World Series for the first time since 2000. The Cubs never had a lead at any point in the four game series. After hitting .529 with the four home runs and a 1.294 slugging percentage for the series, New York's Daniel Murphy was named series MVP.

Postseason rosters

| style="text-align:left" |
Pitchers: 28 Kyle Hendricks 33 Clayton Richard 34 Jon Lester 37 Travis Wood 46 Pedro Strop 49 Jake Arrieta 52 Justin Grimm 53 Trevor Cahill 56 Héctor Rondón 57 Fernando Rodney 
Catchers: 3 David Ross 47 Miguel Montero 
Infielders: 9 Javier Báez 11 Tommy La Stella 13 Starlin Castro 17 Kris Bryant 22 Addison Russell 44 Anthony Rizzo
Outfielders: 5 Quintin Berry 8 Chris Coghlan 12 Kyle Schwarber 15 Chris Denorfia 24 Dexter Fowler 27 Austin Jackson 68 Jorge Soler 
|- valign="top"

| style="text-align:left" |
Pitchers: 28 Kyle Hendricks 33 Clayton Richard 34 Jon Lester 37 Travis Wood 39 Jason Hammel 46 Pedro Strop 49 Jake Arrieta 52 Justin Grimm 53 Trevor Cahill 56 Héctor Rondón 57 Fernando Rodney
Catchers: 3 David Ross 47 Miguel Montero
Infielders: 9 Javier Báez 11 Tommy La Stella 13 Starlin Castro 17 Kris Bryant 22 Addison Russell 44 Anthony Rizzo
Outfielders: 8 Chris Coghlan 12 Kyle Schwarber 15 Chris Denorfia 24 Dexter Fowler 27 Austin Jackson 68 Jorge Soler
|- valign="top"

| style="text-align:left" |
Pitchers: 28 Kyle Hendricks 33 Clayton Richard 34 Jon Lester 37 Travis Wood 39 Jason Hammel 46 Pedro Strop 49 Jake Arrieta 52 Justin Grimm 53 Trevor Cahill 56 Héctor Rondón 57 Fernando Rodney
Catchers: 3 David Ross 47 Miguel Montero
Infielders: 9 Javier Báez 11 Tommy La Stella 13 Starlin Castro 17 Kris Bryant 44 Anthony Rizzo
Outfielders: 5 Quintin Berry 8 Chris Coghlan 12 Kyle Schwarber 15 Chris Denorfia 24 Dexter Fowler 27 Austin Jackson 68 Jorge Soler
|- valign="top"

Regular season statistics

Batting

Note: G = Games played; AB = At bats; R = Runs; H = Hits; 2B = Doubles; 3B = Triples; HR = Home runs; RBI = Runs batted in;  AVG = Batting average; SB = Stolen bases

Pitching

Note: W = Wins; L = Losses; ERA = Earned run average; G = Games pitched; GS = Games started; SV = Saves; IP = Innings pitched; H = Hits allowed; R = Runs allowed; ER = Earned runs allowed; BB = Walks allowed; K = Strikeouts

Farm system

LEAGUE CHAMPIONS: Myrtle Beach

In popular culture
In the 1989 film Back to the Future Part II, the 2015 Chicago Cubs win the World Series.

References

External links

Chicago Cubs schedule for the 2015 season
2015 Chicago Cubs season at ESPN
2015 Chicago Cubs season at Baseball Reference

Chicago Cubs
Cubs
Chicago Cubs seasons